The Time Has Come is the debut studio album by American country music artist Martina McBride, released in 1992. The album rose to the #49 position on the Billboard Top Country Albums chart. It includes the singles "The Time Has Come", "Cheap Whiskey" and "That's Me", all of which charted on the Billboard country charts. "The Time Has Come" was the highest-peaking of the three, reaching #23. "When You Are Old" was later recorded by Gretchen Peters on her 1996 album The Secret of Life.

Track listing

Personnel

Musicians 

 Garth Brooks – backing vocals (6)
 Larry Byrom – electric guitar (5)
 Mike Chapman – bass guitar (1, 2, 4, 6, 7, 8)
 Carol Chase – backing vocals (5, 8)
 Joe Chemay – bass guitar (5, 10)
 Kathy Chiavola – backing vocals (9)
 Conni Ellisor – string conductor (2, 10)
 Sonny Garrish – pedal steel guitar (3, 9, 10), pedabro (9)
 Rob Hajacos – fiddle (4-7)
 John Hobbs –  piano (2, 4, 6, 7, 9)
 John Hughey – steel guitar (2, 4, 6, 7, 8)
 Bill Hulett – acoustic guitar (3, 9)
 Carl Jackson – backing vocals (9)
 Wendy Johnson – backing vocals (5, 8)
 Paul Leim – drums (5, 10)
 Anthony Martin – organ (2), backing vocals (3, 9), synthesizers (4), keyboards (9)
 Brent Mason – electric guitar (1-4, 6-9)
 Martina McBride – lead vocals, backing vocals (2, 3, 6, 7)
 Steve Nathan – acoustic piano (5, 10)
 Ed Seay – bass (8)
 Harry Stinson – backing vocals (1, 3, 4)
 Biff Watson – mandolin (1), acoustic guitar (2, 4, 5, 6, 8, 10), electric guitar (9)
 Bergen White – string arrangements (2, 10)
 Dennis Wilson – backing vocals (1, 3, 4)
 Lonnie Wilson – drums (1-4, 6-9)
 Paul Worley – acoustic guitar
 Glenn Worf – bass guitar (3, 9)
 Carrie Young – backing vocals (7)
 Andrea Zonn – backing vocals (2), fiddle (9)
 The "A" Strings – string section (2, 10)

Production 
 Ed Seay – producer, recording and mixing engineer
 Paul Worley – producer 
 Anthony Martin – associate producer, additional recording, recording and mix assistant 
 Clarke Schleicher – additional recording 
 Jeff Giedt – recording assistant, mix assistant 
 Carlos Grier – digital editing 
 Denny Purcell – mastering engineer

Chart performance

Album

Singles

References

1992 debut albums
Martina McBride albums
RCA Records albums
Albums produced by Paul Worley